Lago di Conza is a reservoir in the Campania region of southern Italy. It is in the province of Avellino near the border with the province of Salerno and the province of Potenza. The Ofanto flows into and out of the reservoir. The reservoir was created in the 1970s for the generation of electricity.

References

Lakes of Campania